Hynden may refer to:
 Hynden Walch, voice actress
 John Hynden, politician